The 1992 Motorcraft Formula Ford Driver to Europe Series was an Australian motor racing competition for Formula Ford racing cars.
It was the 23rd Australian national series for Formula Fords.

The series was won by Cameron McConville driving a Van Diemen RF92.

Schedule
The series was contested over eight rounds with one race per round.

Points system
Series points were awarded on a 20-15-12-10-8-6-4-3-2-1 basis for the first ten places at each round.

Series standings

Note: All cars were powered by a 1600cc Ford Kent engine.

References

Formula Ford Driver to Europe Series
Australian Formula Ford Series